Telehit Música (formerly Ritmoson, shortened for branding purposes to RMS, and Telehit Urbano) is a Mexican-based pan-Spanish American music video channel, part of Televisa Networks, owned by Televisa, the world's largest Spanish-language broadcaster. In addition to its broadcast channel, RMS hosted the Orgullosamente Latino Awards. As with most of Televisa's networks, it is distributed in the United States by Univision Communications.

References

External links
 Official site 

Music television channels
Televisa
Television channels and stations established in 1994
Music organizations based in Mexico